Vasyl Serhiiovych Hrytsak (born 14 January 1967, Bushcha, Dubno Raion, Rivne Oblast, the USSR) is a Ukrainian serviceman, army general, and the fourteenth head of the Security Service of Ukraine. Founder and chairman of the supervisory board of the Ukrainian Center for Analytics and Security. Head of the Security Service of Ukraine (2015–2019). Member of the National Security and Defense Council (2015–2019). General of the Army of Ukraine.

Biography 
Vasyl Hrytsak was born on January 14, 1967, in the village of Bushcha, Dubno  district, Rivne region, the USSR. 
He graduated from Smyha  Secondary School  in 1984. In 1992 he graduated from Lesia Ukrainka Lutsk State Pedagogical University, majoring in history. 
In 1993 and 1997  Hrytsak  graduated from the  courses at the Institute of Personnel Training of the Security Service of Ukraine, in 1998 and 2006 – he graduated the courses at the National Academy of the Security Service of Ukraine.

Career
After serving in the Armed Forces, in 1990 he continued his military service in the security services (sergeant).
From 1991 to 1999 Vasyl Hrytsak served in operational and managerial positions in the department of protection of national statehood of the SBU in the Rivne region.

From 1999 to 2000 he was the deputy head of the Department of National Statehood of the Department of National Statehood Protection and Counter-Terrorism.

From 2000 to 2004, he was the head of the Department of National Statehood of the Department of National Statehood Protection and Counter-Terrorism.

From 2004 to 2005, he was the Deputy Head of the Counterintelligence
Department for Combating Terrorism of the department for the Protection of
National Statehood and the Fight against Terrorism. 

From May 24, 2005 to December 28, 2006 he was the head of the Kyiv Regional Department of the Security Service of Ukraine (the SBU).

From December 28, 2006 по 11 квітня 2008 to April 11, 2008  he is the Head of Kyiv City Department of the Security Service of Ukraine.

From April 11, 2008 to June 4, 2009 he headed the Main Department of the Security Service of Ukraine in Kyiv and Kyiv region.

From June 4, 2009 to December 11, 2009 - the deputy chairman of the Security Service of Ukraine, the Head of the Main Department for Combating Corruption and Organized Crime of the SBU.

From December 11, 2009 to March 12, 2010 - the First Deputy Chairman of the Security Service of Ukraine, the Head of the Main Directorate for Combating Corruption and Organized Crime of the SBU.

Hrytsak was fired from senior positions in the SBU without being removed from the personnel lists in March, 2010.

Since July 7, 2014, he has been of the SBU.

Since July 7, 2014, he has been the head of the SBU Anti-Terrorist Center.

According to media reports, Colonel-General Hrytsak with officers of Alpha Group, often went on combat missions.

The SBU Career 
On June 18, 2015, Vasyl Hrytsak was appointed acting head of the Security
Service of Ukraine. 
On July 2, 2015, Hrytsak was appointed as the Head of the Security Service of Ukraine. The appointment was supported by 340 deputies of the Verkhovna Rada.
By the Decree of the President of Ukraine No. 410/2015 it was introduced into the personnel of the National Security and Defense Council of Ukraine.
On March 25, 2016, he was promoted to General of the Army of Ukraine.

On 22 May 2019 newly elected President Volodymyr Zelensky appointed Ivan Bakanov Hrytsak's first deputy chairman of the SBU. Following this Hrytsak went on  vacation, and Bakanov began to perform his duties. Hrytsak never returned to his post in the SBU and Zelensky officially appointed Bakanov as his successor on 29 August 2019.

Operations 
In December 1999, Vasyl Hrytsak with a support of the SBU and the FSB personally detained Serhiy Ivanchenko, who was the organizer of a terrorist attack against Ukrainian presidential candidate Nataliya Vitrenko.
On July 22, 2009, Oleksiy Pukach, former head of the External Monitoring Department of the Ministry of Internal Affairs of Ukraine, was detained and taken to Kyiv under the direction and with the personal participation of Vasyl Hrytsak in Zhytomyr Region.

On August 14, 2014, the first official exchange of staff took place in the area of the
anti-terrorist operation led by Vasyl Hrytsak.

In April 2015, Hrytsak, as the first deputy head of the SBU and the head of the SBU anti-terrorist center, led a large-scale special operation in Odesa. Under his leadership a group of saboteurs of 27 men who prepared the creation of "Odessa People's Republic" was detained.

In 2016, the SBU warned of a series of terrorist attacks in France that could occur
at the European Football Championship "Euro-2016". The member of the French Senate Natalie Gule personally thanked Vasyl Hrytsak for his contribution to preventing terrorist attacks during the European Football Championship.

During 2016-2017, SBU units led by Hrytsak prevented 22 terrorist acts and detained 62 people.

In 2018, Hrytsak announced that the SBU had opened a case of a terrorist attack near the building of the Espresso Canal, which took place in October 2017. The SBU, led by Hrytsak, investigated Wagner Group activities in eastern Ukraine such as the downing of the IL 76 with Ukrainian paratroopers on board, the storming of Luhansk airport, the storming of Debaltseve and other settlements.

Awards and honors 
The title of Hero of Ukraine with the Order of the Golden Star (May 9,
2019).
 Order of Prince Yaroslav the Wise V degree (December 1, 2016).
 Order of Merit; I degree (2009).
 Order "For Merits" II degree (August 20, 2007 ).
 Order "For Merits" of the III degree (March 18, 2002)
 Badge "Honorary Distinction of the Security Service of Ukraine&quot.
 Diploma of the Cabinet of Ministers of Ukraine.

Personal life
His wife, Olha Volodymyrivna Hrytsak, is the head a food supply company. His son, Oleh Vasylovych Hrytsak, is the  Deputy Prosecutor of the Poltava region (as of 2018).

References 

1967 births
Living people
Directors of the Security Service of Ukraine
Generals of the Army (Ukraine)
Lutsk Pedagogical Institute alumni
People from Rivne Oblast
Recipients of the Order of Merit (Ukraine), 1st class
Recipients of the Order of Merit (Ukraine), 2nd class
Recipients of the Order of Merit (Ukraine), 3rd class
Recipients of the Order of Prince Yaroslav the Wise, 5th class
Recipients of the Order of Gold Star (Ukraine)
Recipients of the Honorary Diploma of the Cabinet of Ministers of Ukraine